OJSC Aviakor is an aviation plant located in Samara, Russia. It is part of the Russian Machines holding under control of the financial industrial group Basic Element  owned by Oleg Deripaska. 
Aviakor constructs, repairs, maintenances, and supplies spare parts for passenger aircraft the Antonov An-140 and Tupolev Tu-154.
Launch of An-140 serial production on Aviakor reinforced the creation of the "International Aircraft project-140"() in collaboration with Kharkiv State Aircraft Manufacturing Company (KSAMC). The joint enterprise was founded on 15 September  2003 upon mutual agreement of Konstantin Titov, Governor of Samara region, and Pavlo Naumenko, General Director of KSAMC

The company owns Bezymyanka Airport.

History
Before The Great Patriotic War Aircraft Plant No. 18 was founded and worked in the city of Voronezh since March 1932. Since the same year the Voronezh Aircraft Plant No. 18 was producing 11 types of aircraft. Since 1939 it was producing the Il-2, and to the beginning of the Great Patriotic War in 1941 produced about 1,510 planes of that type. In USSR Kuibyshev Aviation Plant (No.18) was one of the five largest plants in the aviation industry. For more than half a century the plant produced Tupolev, Antonov and Ilyushin-designed aircraft. During The Great Patriotic War the factory produced 15,099 Ilyushin Il-2s.

After problems receiving An-140 supplies, Aviakor filed for insolvency by the end of September 2017.

Owners and management
 Chairman of the Aviakor — Alexandr Valerievich Filatov.
 CEO of Aviakor — Alexey Viktorovich Gusev.

With the creation of United Aircraft Corporation, Aviakor, according to estimate of Sergei Likharev (CEO of Aviakor), is only one of the plants producing passenger aircraft was not included in its structure. Negotiations on joining the plant to JSC United Aircraft Corporation are conducted since 2008. In summer 2010, Irkut Corporation, part of the United Aircraft Corporation, has bought 10% stake in Aviakor. However, as of August 2011, did not happen any further increasing the share or entering the representatives of Irkut to the board of directors.

See also

Aircraft industry of Russia

References

External links
 Official site of Aviakor

Aircraft manufacturers of Russia
Aircraft manufacturers of the Soviet Union
Companies based in Samara, Russia
Vehicle manufacturing companies established in 1932
Russian brands
JSC Russian Machines
1932 establishments in the Soviet Union